Wei Zhao and Zhao Wei may refer to:

People surnamed Wei
Wei Zhao (Three Kingdoms) (204–273), Chinese scholar during the Three Kingdoms Period
Wei Zhao (footballer) (born 1983), Hong Kong football goalkeeper

People surnamed Zhao
Zhao Wei (born 1976), Chinese actress, singer and director
Zhao Wei (basketball) (born 1963), Chinese Olympic basketball player
Zhao Wei (hammer thrower) (born 1979), female Chinese hammer thrower
Zhao Wei (footballer) (born 1989), Chinese footballer
Zhao Wei (legal assistant) (born 1991), Chinese human rights activist
Wei Zhao (computer scientist), Chinese-American computer scientist
Zhao Wei (gangster), Chinese gangster and the founder of Hong Kong-registered company Kings Romans Group